Skin fragility syndrome (also known as "plakophilin 1 deficiency") is a cutaneous condition characterized by trauma-induced blisters and erosions.

It is associated with PKP1.

See also 
 List of conditions caused by problems with junctional proteins

References

External links 

Genodermatoses
Syndromes